Trichophysetis aurantidiscalis is a moth in the family Crambidae. It is found in China.

References

Cybalomiinae
Moths described in 1934
Moths of Asia